Gudo is a former municipality in the district of Bellinzona in the canton of Ticino in Switzerland.

Gudo may also refer to:

 Gudo Visconti, municipality in the Metropolitan City of Milan in the region Lombardy, Italy
 Gudō Station, railway station on the Tosa Kuroshio Railway Sukumo Line in Shimanto, Kōchi Prefecture, Japan